Sunday Night at the Vanguard is an album by the Fred Hersch Trio. It earned the group a Grammy Award nomination for Best Jazz Instrumental Album.

Personnel 
Musicians
 Fred Hersch – piano
 John Hébert – bass
 Eric McPherson – drums

References 

2016 albums
Fred Hersch albums
Instrumental albums